Alstad Station was a railway station on the Nordland Line just north of the village of Skatval in Stjørdal municipality in Trøndelag county, Norway. With the opening of the section of the Hell–Sunnan Line through Stjørdal on 29 October 1902, a passing loop was taken into use at Alstad. The passing loop was removed in 1972 and the station remained in revenue service until 23 May 1993. It was officially closed on 1 September 1993.

References

Railway stations in Stjørdal
Railway stations on the Nordland Line
Railway stations opened in 1934
Railway stations closed in 1993
1934 establishments in Norway